The Son of Thomas Gray is a 1914 American silent short film directed by Lorimer Johnston.  The film stars Virginia Fordyce, Dolly Beal, Sydney Ayres, Jacques Jaccard, Louise Lester, Jack Richardson, Vivian Rich, and Harry Van Meter.

References

External links

1914 films
1914 drama films
Silent American drama films
American silent short films
American black-and-white films
1914 short films
Films directed by Lorimer Johnston
1910s American films
American drama short films
1910s English-language films